Bojan Šljivančanin (Serbian Cyrillic: Бојан Шљиванчанин; born 4 May 1982) is a retired Montenegrin footballer who played as a central defender and defensive midfielder.

Club career
Born in Pljevlja (SR Montenegro, SFR Yugoslavia), he started his career in his hometown club FK Rudar Pljevlja having joined their youth squad in 1992. In summer 2003 he moved to FK Vojvodina, one of the strongest Serbian clubs but, after not having received much chances to play, he was loaned to Rudar Pljevlja.

After starting the season of 2005–06 in FK Jedinstvo Bijelo Polje, in the winter break he moved to the giants FK Partizan, where he played until the end of that season.

Next, he was loaned to Rudar, now competing in the Montenegrin First League, and, since January 2007, played for Partizan's satellite club FK Teleoptik. Since 2008, he is back to Montenegro, and plays again with Rudar Pljevlja. In 2015, he signed for the Canadian Soccer League's Serbian White Eagles FC but left the club after three months, not making any appearances in the process.

References

External links
 Profile at Soccerterminal
 Jedinstvo 2005-06 at FootballSquads

1982 births
Living people
Sportspeople from Pljevlja
Association football central defenders
Serbia and Montenegro footballers
Montenegrin footballers
FK Rudar Pljevlja players
FK Vojvodina players
FK Radnički Obrenovac players
FK Jedinstvo Bijelo Polje players
FK Partizan players
FK Teleoptik players
Serbian White Eagles FC players
First League of Serbia and Montenegro players
Montenegrin First League players
Canadian Soccer League (1998–present) players
Montenegrin expatriate footballers
Expatriate footballers in Serbia
Montenegrin expatriate sportspeople in Serbia
Expatriate soccer players in Canada
Montenegrin expatriate sportspeople in Canada